Emanuel Granberg (1754–1797) was a Finnish painter.

Granberg was born in Vihanti. His father was a chaplain. Granberg primarily worked on murals and paintings for local churches. His first work was for the Muhos church 1773–1774. He also produced works for churches in Oulunsalo, Raahe, Sotkamo. Some of his surviving works can be found in the Oulu Museum of Art and the National Museum of Finland.

References
 Onni Okkonen, Finnish art history, 252

1754 births
1797 deaths
Finnish male painters
18th-century Finnish painters
18th-century male artists